Prince Adalbert Wilhelm Georg Ludwig of Bavaria (Munich, 19 July 1828 – Nymphenburg Palace, 21 September 1875) was the ninth child and fourth son of Ludwig I of Bavaria and Therese of Saxe-Hildburghausen.

Marriage
In Madrid on 25 August 1856 he married Infanta Amalia of Spain (1834–1905), sister of King-Consort Francis, Duke of Cádiz, sixth daughter and eleventh child of Infante Francisco de Paula of Spain (a younger son of King Charles IV of Spain) and Princess Luisa Carlotta of Bourbon-Two Sicilies.  They had five children :

 Prince Ludwig Ferdinand of Bavaria (1859–1949); married Infanta María de la Paz of Spain.
 Prince Alfons of Bavaria (1862–1933); married Princess Louise of Orléans, daughter of Prince Ferdinand, Duke of Alençon.
 Princess Isabella of Bavaria (1863–1924); married Prince Thomas, Duke of Genoa.
 Princess Elvira of Bavaria (1868–1943); married Count Rudolf von Wrbna-Kaunitz-Rietberg-Questenberg und Freudenthal.
 Princess Clara of Bavaria (1874–1941); unmarried, 1109th Dame of the Order of Queen Maria Luisa.

Death
Prince Adalbert of Bavaria died on 21 September 1875 (the same day as his sister Alexandra) in Munich and is buried in the crypt of Michaelskirche in Munich, Bavaria.

Greek succession
It is often suggested that following his older brother Otto's death, Prince Adalbert became the heir presumptive to the throne of Greece. In fact, rights to the Greek succession were passed onto his other older brother Luitpold, who technically succeeded to the Greek throne in 1867. Due to the renunciation of all the rights to the Greek succession by King Ludwig III, at Luitpold's death the rights to the throne of Greece were inherited by his second son, Prince Leopold.

However, if it is proven that all legitimate descendants of Luitpold (barring those through King Ludwig III) are indeed extinct (discounting also the male descendants of Prince Georg of Bavaria), Adalbert's male-line descendants could conceivably assume the claim to the throne of Greece.

Honours
He received the following orders and decorations:

Ancestry

References

Literature
 Die Wittelsbacher. Geschichte unserer Familie. Prestel Verlag, München, 1979

1828 births
1875 deaths
House of Wittelsbach
Members of the Bavarian Reichsrat
Princes of Bavaria
Burials at St. Michael's Church, Munich
Grand Crosses of the Order of Saint Stephen of Hungary
Recipients of the Order of the Medjidie, 1st class
Knights of the Golden Fleece of Spain
Sons of kings